Honda of Canada Manufacturing is located in Alliston, Ontario and is the automobile manufacturing division  of Honda Canada Inc.

Manufacturing
The large cavernous plants require radios between members for communication and cold water chillers for HVAC systems.

Currently, the two main plants have approximately 4,600 employees and have an annual capacity of 390,580 cars per year. Plant 1 was built in 1986. It is the first Canadian manufacturing facility by a Japanese automaker. A stamping and bumper painting line was added in 1989. Production of the Civic coupe commenced in 1993. Honda's second plant in Alliston began production in 1998, originally building Honda Odyssey vans for the 1999 model year. Production of the Odyssey in Canada stopped in 2004 to make room for the Ridgeline. Production of the Honda Pilot in Canada stopped in 2007 to allow Civic sedans to be built in Plant 2.

In May 2006, Honda announced it would build a 154 million engine plant in Alliston to supply about 200,000 engines a year for the Civic model. The plant opened in 2008. The plant has capacity of 260,000 four-cylinder engines.

Early 2009 saw the end of Ridgeline production at the Alliston Assembly facility.  Ridgeline production has been moved to Honda's Alabama assembly line.  The discontinuance of Ridgeline production would make room for more Civic production at Plant 2.

January 29, 2009 Honda announced further reductions in production at the Alliston plant. "One assembly line at the facility will go from two daily work shifts to one. Output of Civic and Acura MDX models made on the line will be halved from 800 units a day to 400 units."  

In early 2012, Honda of Canada Manufacturing became Honda's first plant in North America to produce four distinct models: Civic, CR-V, MDX and ZDX from the same production line, demonstrating its flexibility and capability.

On March 28, 2013, the last Acura MDX was assembled in Alliston.  Production was moved to Honda's Alabama plant.  Since 2000 (2001 model year), a total of 713,158 MDXs were manufactured at HCM.  Honda of Canada Manufacturing now builds Civics and CR-Vs only. In February 2020, Honda built its nine-millionth vehicle in Ontario.

On Wednesday March 16, 2022 Ontario Premier, Doug Ford announced funding millions of dollars into the expansion of the plant for domestic hybrid and EV production. The project is estimated to take 6 six years and cost around 1.4 billion dollars.

Vehicles Produced

Discontinued Models:

Honda Accord (1986–88), Honda Civic coupe (1993-2020), Honda Odyssey, Honda Pilot, Honda Ridgeline (2004-2009), Acura CSX (2005–11), Acura EL (1996-2005), Acura MDX, and Acura ZDX.

References

External links
Honda Canada Manufacturing

Canadian subsidiaries of foreign companies
Honda factories
Motor vehicle assembly plants in Canada
Simcoe County